Maritza Corredor Alvarez (born 21 January 1969) is a road cyclist from Colombia. She represented her nation at the 1996 Summer Olympics in the women's road race.

References

External links
 profile at sports-reference.com

Colombian female cyclists
Cyclists at the 1996 Summer Olympics
Olympic cyclists of Colombia
Living people
Place of birth missing (living people)
1969 births
20th-century Colombian women